Baylee Wylee Littrell (born November 26, 2002) is an American country singer. His debut album, 770-Country, was released on November 15, 2019, and included songs written by Gary Baker, Corey Crowder, Seth Ennis, Tyler Hubbard, Steven Lee Olsen, Daniel Ross, and Littrell himself.

Early life 
Littrell was born on November 26, 2002, in Atlanta, Georgia, to model and actress Leighanne Wallace and Backstreet Boys member Brian Littrell. His father's cousin, Kevin Richardson, is also a member of the Backstreet Boys. He is an only child.

Being a sports fan like his father, Littrell started playing on a Little League and basketball rec teams both coached by his father as well as karate, lacrosse, football and soccer. He also took lessons in acting, dance and cooking. When he was six, he developed Kawasaki syndrome, a collection of symptoms that stem from swollen blood vessels around his heart. His parents announced the diagnosis on Brian's official website.

Littrell has been homeschooled since he was around seven or eight and was able to skip a grade at home and on the road. In doing so, he has been working on his schooling while performing as an actor and a singer, with his dad as his musical director and his mom as his manager. Now that he has graduated, and just released his first country album, he still plans on going to college.

Career

Early career 
Littrell first became involved in music when he was two years old, accompanying his dad on the Never Gone Tour, but never really got into music until around first grade, when he attended band, theater, and acting camps over the summer. Later, he even started writing songs consisting of little poems, when he was 6–7. Pretty soon, his piano teacher heard him sing when he was only 6. By the time when he was 8 years old, he did a little skit with his cousin and was a band in elementary school, which lead him to realized that this is what he wants to do, follow his parents' footsteps despite them being concerned about him. He eventually started taking lessons in acting, singing, playing the piano, and learned to play the guitar from his father, Brian.

Broadway 
When he was 13, his family left their Atlanta home for the Upper West Side of Manhattan while Littrell made his Broadway debut in the musical Disaster! playing identical twins Ben and Lisa on March 8, 2016, at the Nederlander Theatre. His performance earned him a Drama Desk nomination in 2016.

Solo artist 
By the time he was nine, he started opening arena shows for his dad and the Backstreet Boys around the world, usually performing two songs. When he finished his time on Broadway, he turned to his parents and announced that he wanted to start his career as a country artist, which he did, writing his songs and listening to Florida Georgia Line.

On April 3, 2019, the Backstreet Boys announced Littrell as an opening act for their North American leg of the DNA World Tour. The tour started on July 12, 2019, in Washington D.C. at the Capital One Arena and ran through September 2019.

Starting on October 31, 2019, Littrell joined American country music artist Chris Lane for a string of performances on his Big Big Plans tour in Cincinnati, Ohio; Louisville, Kentucky; and Atlanta, Georgia.

On November 15, 2019, Littrell released his debut album, 770-Country, via BriLeigh Records. The album includes songwriting and production from Gary Baker, Corey Crowder, Seth Ennis, Tyler Hubbard, Steven Lee Olsen, Daniel Ross, and Littrell himself. It features singles such as "Boxes", "Don't Knock It", and "We Run This Beach".

In May 2022, he reported he was working on his second album.

On July 27, Littrell joined his dad, cousin, and the rest of the Backstreet Boys in a charity Softball game in Columbus, Ohio for charity benefitting On Our Sleeves, the movement for children’s mental health powered by behavioral health experts at Nationwide Children’s Hospital.

On September 9, 2022, Littrell released his first ep, EP Vol. One.

Influences 
Littrell has said that some of his biggest musical influences include Tim McGraw (his greatest inspiration), Florida Georgia Line, George Strait, and Johnny Cash. He has said that other than his father, his favorite Backstreet Boy member is AJ McLean.

Personal life 
Littrell resides near Atlanta in Alpharetta, Georgia, with his parents. He has an uncle named Harold Littrell III, a singer and actor, and his paternal grandparents are named Harold Littrell Jr. and Jacqueline "Jackie" Rhea (nee Fox).

Littrell has dated a number of women but has not married.

Discography

Albums

Singles

References 

American country singer-songwriters
Living people
2002 births
Country musicians from Georgia (U.S. state)
American male singer-songwriters